Serial Experiments Lain (stylized all lowercase) is a Japanese anime television series created and co-produced by Yasuyuki Ueda, written by Chiaki J. Konaka and directed by Ryūtarō Nakamura. Animated by Triangle Staff and featuring original character designs by Yoshitoshi ABe, the series was broadcast for 13 episodes on TV Tokyo and its affiliates from July to September 1998. The series follows Lain Iwakura, an adolescent girl in suburban Japan, and her relation to the Wired, a global communications network similar to the internet.

Lain features surreal and avant-garde imagery and explores philosophical topics such as reality, identity, and communication. The series incorporates creative influences from computer history, cyberpunk, and conspiracy theory. Critics and fans have praised Lain for its originality, visuals, atmosphere, themes, and its dark depiction of a world fraught with paranoia, social alienation, and reliance on technology considered insightful of 21st century life. It received the Excellence Prize at the Japan Media Arts Festival in 1998.

Plot
Lain Iwakura, a junior high school girl, lives in suburban Japan with her middle-class family, consisting of her inexpressive older sister Mika, her emotionally distant mother, and her computer-obsessed father; Lain herself is somewhat awkward, introverted, and socially isolated from most of her school peers. The status-quo of her life becomes upturned by a series of bizarre incidents that start to take place after she learns that girls from her school have received an e-mail from a dead student, Chisa Yomoda, and she pulls out her old computer in order to check for the same message. Lain finds Chisa telling her via email that she is not dead but has merely "abandoned her physical self" and is alive deep within the virtual realm of the Wired itself, where she claims she has found "God" there. From this point, Lain is caught up in a series of cryptic and surreal events that see her delving deeper into the mystery of the network in a narrative that explores themes of consciousness, perception, and the nature of reality.

"The Wired" is a virtual realm that contains and supports the very sum of all human communication and networks, created with the telegraph, televisions, and telephone services, and expanded with the Internet, cyberspace, and subsequent networks. The series assumes that the Wired could be linked to a system that enables unconscious communication between people and machines without physical interface. The storyline introduces such a system with the Schumann resonances, a property of the Earth's magnetic field that theoretically allows for unhindered long-distance communications. If such a link were created, the network would become equivalent to Reality as the general consensus of all perceptions and knowledge. The increasingly thin invisible line between what is real and what is virtual/digital begins to slowly shatter.

Masami Eiri is introduced as the project director on Protocol Seven (the next-generation Internet protocol in the series' time-frame) for major computer company Tachibana General Laboratories. He had secretly included code of his very own creation to give himself absolute control of the Wired through the wireless system described above. He then "uploaded" his own consciousness into the Wired and "died" a few days after, leaving only his body behind. These details are unveiled around the middle of the series, but this is the point where the story begins. Masami later explains that Lain is the artifact by which the wall between the virtual and material worlds is to fall, and that he needs her to go into the Wired and "abandon the flesh", as he did, to achieve his plan. The series sees him trying to convince her through interventions, using the promise of unconditional love, romantic seduction and charm, and even, when all else fails, threats and force.

In the meantime, the anime follows a complex game of hide-and-seek between the "Knights of the Eastern Calculus" (based on the Knights of the Lambda Calculus), hackers whom Masami claims are "believers that enable him to be a God in the Wired", and Tachibana General Laboratories, who try to regain control of Protocol Seven. In the end, the viewer sees Lain realizing, after much introspection, that she has absolute control over everyone's mind and over reality itself. Her dialogue with different versions of herself shows how she feels shunned from the material world, and how she is afraid to live in the Wired, where she has the possibilities and responsibilities of an almighty goddess. The last scenes feature her erasing everything connected to herself from everyone else's memories of her and everything else that has happened since the premiere. She is last seen, unchanged, encountering her oldest and closest friend Alice once again, who is now married. Lain promises herself that she and Alice will surely meet again anytime as Lain can literally go and be anywhere she desires between both worlds.

Characters

The titular character of the series. Lain is a fourteen-year-old girl who uncovers her true nature through the series. She is first depicted as a shy junior high school student with few friends or interests. She later grows multiple bolder personalities, both in the physical world and the Wired, and starts making more friends. As the series progresses, she eventually comes to discover that she is, in reality, merely an autonomous, sentient computer program in the physical and corporeal form of a human being, designed to sever the invisible barrier between the Wired and the real world. In the end, Lain is challenged to accept herself as a de facto goddess for the Wired, having become an omnipotent and omnipresent virtual being with worshippers of her own, as well as an ability to exist beyond the borders of devices, time, or space.

 The key designer of Protocol Seven. While working for Tachibana General Laboratories, he illicitly included codes enabling him to control the whole protocol at will and embedded his own mind and will into the seventh protocol. Because of this, he was fired by Tachibana General Laboratories, and was found dead not long after. He believes that the only way for humans to evolve even further and develop even greater abilities is to absolve themselves of their physical and human limitations, and to live as virtual entities—or avatars—in the Wired for eternity. He claims to have been Lain's creator all along, but was in truth standing in for another as an acting god, who was waiting for the Wired to reach its more evolved current state: Lain herself.
According to another Lain, however, he has never truly existed all along and would not have had any self-obsessed ideas about being God if he had. 

Lain's father. Passionate about computers and electronic communication, he works with Masami Eiri at Tachibana General Laboratories. He subtly pushes Lain, his "youngest daughter", towards the Wired and monitors her development until she becomes more and more aware of herself and of her raison d'être. He eventually leaves Lain, telling her that although he did not enjoy playing house, he genuinely loved and cared for her as a real father would. Despite Yasuo's eagerness to lure Lain into the Wired, he warns her not to get overly involved in it or to confuse it with the real world.

Lain's mother. Although she dotes on her husband, she is indifferent towards both her kids. Like her husband, she ends up leaving Lain. She is a computer scientist.

Lain's classmate and only true friend throughout the series. She is very sincere and has no discernable quirks. She is the first to attempt to help Lain socialize; she takes her out to a nightclub. From then on, she tries her best to look after Lain. Alice, along with her two best friends Julie and Reika, were taken by Chiaki Konaka from his previous work, Alice in Cyberland.

Lain's older sister, an apathetic sixteen-year-old high school student. She seems to enjoy mocking Lain's behavior and interests. Mika is considered by Anime Revolution to be the only normal member of Lain's family: she sees her boyfriend in love hotels, is on a diet, and shops in Shibuya. At a certain point in the series, she becomes heavily traumatized by violent hallucinations; while Lain begins freely delving into the Wired, Mika is taken there by her proximity to Lain, and she gets stuck between the real world and the Wired.

A young boy of about Lain's age. He occasionally works for the Knights to bring forth "the one truth". Despite this, he has not yet been made a member, and knows nothing of their true intentions. Taro loves VR games and hangs out all day at Cyberia with his friends, Myu-Myu and Masayuki. He uses special technology, such as custom Handi Navi and video goggles. Taro takes pride in his internet anonymity, and he asks Lain for a date with her Wired self in exchange for information.

A top executive from Tachibana General Laboratories. He has a personal agenda, which he carries out with the help of the Men in Black. He looks forward to the arrival of a real God through the Wired, and is the man behind the Knights' mass assassination. There are many things he does not know about Lain, but he would rather ask questions about her than disclose his agenda.

, 
Lin Suixi, 
The Men in Black work for the above "Office Worker" in tracking down and murdering all of the members of the Knights. They are not told the true plan, but they know that Masami Eiri is somehow involved, despite having been "killed." They see no need for an almighty, all-powerful God—let alone Lain—in the Wired.

A teenage girl who committed suicide at the beginning of the series. After her death, she e-mails Lain, Julie, and a few other kids, saying that she is still alive in the Wired, leading to the series events.

One of Alice's friends from school. She does not seem to care for Lain, since she harasses her quite a lot. She is more serious than Julie, and also somewhat meaner.

Another friend of Alice. She also harasses Lain, but not as severely as Reika does. She is sometimes insensitive to other people's feelings.

Taro's best friend. He is usually seen hanging out with Taro and Myu-Myu.

A young girl who hangs out with Taro and Masayuki at Cyberia Café. She has feelings for Taro, so she gets jealous when he flirts with Lain.

Production
Serial Experiments Lain was conceived, as a series, to be original to the point of it being considered "an enormous risk" by its producer Yasuyuki Ueda.

Producer Ueda had to answer repeated queries about a statement made in an Animerica interview. The controversial statement said Lain was "a sort of cultural war against American culture and the American sense of values we [Japan] adopted after World War II". He later explained in numerous interviews that he created Lain with a set of values he took as distinctly Japanese; he hoped Americans would not understand the series as the Japanese would. This would lead to a "war of ideas" over the meaning of the anime, hopefully culminating in new communication between the two cultures. When he discovered that the American audience held the same views on the series as the Japanese, he was disappointed.

The Lain franchise was originally conceived to connect across forms of media (anime, video games, manga). Producer Yasuyuki Ueda said in an interview, "the approach I took for this project was to communicate the essence of the work by the total sum of many media products". The scenario for the video game was written first, and the video game was produced at the same time as the anime series, though the series was released first. A dōjinshi titled "The Nightmare of Fabrication" was produced by Yoshitoshi ABe and released in Japanese in the artbook An Omnipresence in Wired. Ueda and Konaka declared in an interview that the idea of a multimedia project was not unusual in Japan, as opposed to the contents of Lain, and the way they are exposed.

Writing
The authors were asked in interviews if they had been influenced by Neon Genesis Evangelion, in the themes and graphic design. This was strictly denied by writer Chiaki J. Konaka in an interview, arguing that he had not even seen Evangelion until he finished the fourth episode of Lain. Being primarily a horror movie writer, his stated influences are Godard (especially for using typography on screen), The Exorcist, Hell House, and Dan Curtis's House of Dark Shadows. Alice's name, like the names of her two friends Julie and Reika, came from a previous production from Konaka, Alice in Cyberland, which in turn was largely influenced by Alice in Wonderland. As the series developed, Konaka was "surprised" by how close Alice's character became to the original Wonderland character.

Vannevar Bush (and memex), John C. Lilly, Timothy Leary and his eight-circuit model of consciousness, Ted Nelson and Project Xanadu are cited as precursors to the Wired. Douglas Rushkoff and his book Cyberia were originally to be cited as such, and in Lain Cyberia became the name of a nightclub populated with hackers and techno-punk teenagers. Likewise, the series' deus ex machina lies in the conjunction of the Schumann resonances and Jung's collective unconscious (the authors chose this term over Kabbalah and Akashic Record). Majestic 12 and the Roswell UFO incident are used as examples of how a hoax might still affect history, even after having been exposed as such, by creating sub-cultures. This links again to Vannevar Bush, the alleged "brains" of MJ12. Two of the literary references in Lain are quoted through Lain's father: he first logs onto a website with the password ""  ("Think Blue, Count Two" is an Instrumentality of Man story featuring virtual persons projected as real ones in people's minds); and his saying that "madeleines would be good with the tea" in the last episode makes Lain "perhaps the only cartoon to allude to Proust".

Character design

Yoshitoshi ABe confesses to have never read manga as a child, as it was "off-limits" in his household. His major influences are "nature and everything around him". Specifically speaking about Lain's character, ABe was inspired by Kenji Tsuruta, Akihiro Yamada, Range Murata and Yukinobu Hoshino. In a broader view, he has been influenced in his style and technique by Japanese artists Kyosuke Chinai and Toshio Tabuchi.

The character design of Lain was not ABe's sole responsibility. Her distinctive left forelock for instance was a demand from Yasuyuki Ueda. The goal was to produce asymmetry to reflect Lain's unstable and disconcerting nature. It was designed as a mystical symbol, as it is supposed to prevent voices and spirits from being heard by the left ear. The bear pajamas she wears were a demand from character animation director Takahiro Kishida. Though bears are a trademark of the Konaka brothers, Chiaki Konaka first opposed the idea. Director Nakamura then explained how the bear motif could be used as a shield for confrontations with her family. It is a key element of the design of the shy "real world" Lain (see "mental illness" under Themes). When she first goes to the Cyberia nightclub, she wears a bear hat for similar reasons. Retrospectively, Konaka said that Lain's pajamas became a major factor in drawing fans of moe characterization to the series, and remarked that "such items may also be important when making anime".

ABe's original design was generally more complicated than what finally appeared on screen. As an example, the X-shaped hairclip was to be an interlocking pattern of gold links. The links would open with a snap, or rotate around an axis until the moment the " X " became a " = ". This was not used as there is no scene where Lain takes her hairclip off.

Themes
Serial Experiments Lain is not a conventionally linear story, being described as "an alternative anime, with modern themes and realization". Themes range from theological to psychological and are dealt with in a number of ways: from classical dialogue to image-only introspection, passing by direct interrogation of imaginary characters.

Communication, in its wider sense, is one of the main themes of the series, not only as opposed to loneliness, but also as a subject in itself. Writer Konaka said he wanted to directly "communicate human feelings". Director Nakamura wanted to show the audience — and particularly viewers between 14 and 15—"the multidimensional wavelength of the existential self: the relationship between self and the world".

Loneliness, if only as representing a lack of communication, is recurrent through Lain. Lain herself (according to Anime Jump) is "almost painfully introverted with no friends to speak of at school, a snotty, condescending sister, a strangely apathetic mother, and a father who seems to want to care but is just too damn busy to give her much of his time". Friendships turn on the first rumor; and the only insert song of the series is named Kodoku no shigunaru, literally "signal of loneliness".

Mental illness, especially dissociative identity disorder, is a significant theme in Lain: the main character is constantly confronted with alter-egos, to the point where writer Chiaki Konaka and Lain's voice actress Kaori Shimizu had to agree on subdividing the character's dialogues between three different orthographs. The three names designate distinct "versions" of Lain: the real-world, "childish" Lain has a shy attitude and bear pajamas. The "advanced" Lain, her Wired personality, is bold and questioning. Finally, the "evil" Lain is sly and devious, and does everything she can to harm Lain or the ones close to her. As a writing convention, the authors spelled their respective names in kanji, katakana, and roman characters (see picture).

Reality never has the pretense of objectivity in Lain. Acceptations of the term are battling throughout the series, such as the "natural" reality, defined through normal dialogue between individuals; the material reality; and the tyrannic reality, enforced by one person onto the minds of others. A key debate to all interpretations of the series is to decide whether matter flows from thought, or the opposite. The production staff carefully avoided "the so-called God's Eye Viewpoint" to make clear the "limited field of vision" of the world of Lain.

Theology plays its part in the development of the story too. Lain has been viewed as a questioning of the possibility of an infinite spirit in a finite body. From self-realization as a goddess to deicide, religion (the title of a layer) is an inherent part of Lain background.

Apple computers
Lain contains extensive references to Apple computers, as the brand was used at the time by most of the creative staff, such as writers, producers, and the graphical team. As an example, the title at the beginning of each episode is announced by the Apple computer speech synthesis program PlainTalk, using the voice "Whisper", e.g. say -v Whisper "Weird: Layer zero one". Tachibana Industries, the company that creates the NAVI computers, is a reference to Apple computers: the tachibana orange is a  Japanese variety of mandarin orange. NAVI is the abbreviation of Knowledge Navigator, and the HandiNAVI is based on the Apple Newton, one of the world's first PDAs. The NAVIs are seen to run "Copland OS Enterprise" (this reference to Copland was an initiative of Konaka, a declared Apple fan), and Lain's and Alice's NAVIs closely resembles the Twentieth Anniversary Macintosh and the iMac G3 respectively. The HandiNAVI programming language, as seen on the seventh episode, is a dialect of Lisp; the Newton also used a Lisp dialect (NewtonScript). The program being typed by Lain can be found in the CMU AI repository; it is a simple implementation of Conway's Game of Life in Common Lisp.

During a series of disconnected images, an iMac and the Think Different advertising slogan appears for a short time, while the Whisper voice says it. This was an unsolicited insertion from the graphic team, also Mac-enthusiasts. Other subtle allusions can be found: "Close the world, Open the nExt" is the slogan for the Serial Experiments Lain video game. NeXT was the company that produced NeXTSTEP, which later evolved into Mac OS X after Apple bought NeXT. Another example is "To Be Continued." at the end of episodes 1–12, with a blue "B" and a red "e" on "Be"; this matches the original logo of Be Inc., a company founded by ex-Apple employees and NeXT's main competitor in its time.

Broadcast and release history
Serial Experiments Lain was first aired on TV Tokyo and its affiliates on July 6, 1998, and concluded on September 28, 1998, with the thirteenth and final episode. The series consists of 13 episodes (referred to in the series as "Layers") of 24 minutes each, except for the sixth episode, Kids (23 minutes 14 seconds). In Japan, the episodes were released in LD, VHS, and DVD with a total of five volumes. A DVD compilation named "Serial Experiments Lain DVD-BOX Яesurrection" was released along with a promo DVD called "LPR-309" in 2000. As this box set is now discontinued, a rerelease was made in 2005 called "Serial Experiments Lain TV-BOX". A 4-volume DVD box set was released in the US by Pioneer/Geneon. A Blu-ray release of the anime was made in December 2009 called "Serial Experiments Lain Blu-ray Box| RESTORE". The anime series returned to US television on October 15, 2012, on the Funimation Channel.
The series' opening theme, "Duvet", was written and performed by Jasmine Rodgers and the British band Bôa. The ending theme, was written and composed by Reichi Nakaido.

The anime series was licensed in North America by Pioneer Entertainment (later Geneon USA) on VHS and DVD in 1999. However, the company closed its USA division in December 2007 and the series went out-of-print as a result. However, at Anime Expo 2010, North American distributor Funimation announced that it had obtained the license to the series and re-released it in 2012.

Episode list

Reception

Serial Experiments Lain was first broadcast in Tokyo at 1:15 a.m. JST. The word "weird" appears almost systematically in English language reviews of the series, or the alternatives "bizarre", and "atypical", due mostly to the freedoms taken with the animation and its unusual science fiction themes, and due to its philosophical and psychological context. Critics responded positively to these thematic and stylistic characteristics, and it was awarded an Excellence Prize by the 1998 Japan Media Arts Festival for "its willingness to question the meaning of contemporary life" and the "extraordinarily philosophical and deep questions" it asks.

According to Christian Nutt from Newtype USA, the main attraction to the series is its keen view on "the interlocking problems of identity and technology". Nutt saluted Abe's "crisp, clean character design" and the "perfect soundtrack" in his 2005 review of series, saying that "Serial Experiments Lain might not yet be considered a true classic, but it's a fascinating evolutionary leap that helped change the future of anime." Anime Jump gave it 4.5/5, and Anime on DVD gave it A+ on all criteria for volume 1 and 2, and a mix of A and A+ for volume 3 and 4.
Lain was subject to commentary in the literary and academic worlds. The Asian Horror Encyclopedia calls it "an outstanding psycho-horror anime about the psychic and spiritual influence of the Internet". It notes that the red spots present in all the shadows look like blood pools (see picture). It notes the death of a girl in a train accident is "a source of much ghost lore in the twentieth century", more so in Tokyo.

The Anime Essentials anthology by Gilles Poitras describes it as a "complex and somehow existential" anime that "pushed the envelope" of anime diversity in the 1990s, alongside the much better known Neon Genesis Evangelion and Cowboy Bebop. Professor Susan J. Napier, in her 2003 reading to the American Philosophical Society called The Problem of Existence in Japanese Animation (published 2005), compared Serial Experiments Lain to Ghost in the Shell and Hayao Miyazaki's Spirited Away. According to her, the main characters of the two other works cross barriers; they can cross back to our world, but Lain cannot. Napier asks whether there is something to which Lain should return, "between an empty 'real' and a dark 'virtual'". Mike Toole of Anime News Network named Serial Experiments Lain as one of the most important anime of the 1990s.

Despite the positive feedback the television series had received, Anime Academy gave the series a 75%, partly due to the "lifeless" setting it had. Michael Poirier of EX magazine stated that the last three episodes fail to resolve the questions in other DVD volumes. Justin Sevakis of Anime News Network noted that the English dub was decent, but that the show relied so little on dialogue that it hardly mattered.

Related media

Art books
An Omnipresence In Wired: Hardbound, 128 pages in 96 colors with Japanese text. It features a chapter for each layer (episode) and concept sketches. It also features a short color manga titled "The Nightmare of Fabrication". It was published in 1998 by Triangle Staff/SR-12W/Pioneer LDC.
Yoshitoshi ABe lain illustrations ab# rebuild an omnipresence in Wired: Hardbound, 148 pages. A remake of "An Omnipresence In Wired" with new art, added text by Chiaki J. Konaka, and a section entitled "ABe's EYE in color of things" (a compilation of his photos of the world). It was published in Japan on October 1, 2005, by Wanimagazine, and in America as a softcover version translated into English on June 27, 2006, by Digital Manga Publishing.
Visual Experiments Lain: Paperback, 80 full-color pages with Japanese text. It has details on the creation, design, and storyline of the series. It was published in 1998 by Triangle Staff/Pioneer LDC.
Scenario Experiments Lain: Paperback, 335 pages. By "chiaki j. konaka" (uncapitalized in original). It contains collected scripts with notes and small excerpted storyboards. It was published in 1998 in Japan.()

Soundtracks
The first original soundtrack, Serial Experiments Lain Soundtrack, features music by Reichi Nakaido: the ending theme and part of the television series' score, alongside other songs inspired by the series. The second, Serial Experiments Lain Soundtrack: Cyberia Mix, features electronica songs inspired by the television series, including a remix of the opening theme "Duvet" by DJ Wasei. The third, lain BOOTLEG, consists of the ambient score of the series across forty-five tracks. BOOTLEG also contains a second mixed-mode data and audio disc, containing a clock program and a game, as well as an extended version of the first disc – nearly double the length – across 57 tracks in 128 kbit/s MP3 format, and sound effects from the series in WAV format. Because the word bootleg appears in its title, it is easily confused with the Sonmay counterfeit edition of itself, which only contains the first disc in an edited format. All three soundtrack albums were released by Pioneer Records.

The series' opening theme, "Duvet", was written and performed in English by the British rock band Bôa. The band released the song as a single and as part of the EP Tall Snake, which features both an acoustic version and DJ Wasei's remix from Cyberia Mix.

Video game

On November 26, 1998, Pioneer LDC released a video game with the same name as the anime for the PlayStation. It was designed by Konaka and Yasuyuki, and made to be a "network simulator" in which the player would navigate to explore Lain's story. The creators themselves did not call it a game, but "Psycho-Stretch-Ware", and it has been described as being a kind of graphic novel: the gameplay is limited to unlocking pieces of information, and then reading/viewing/listening to them, with little or no puzzle needed to unlock. Lain distances itself even more from classical games by the random order in which information is collected. The aim of the authors was to let the player get the feeling that there are myriads of informations that they would have to sort through, and that they would have to do with less than what exists to understand. As with the anime, the creative team's main goal was to let the player "feel" Lain, and "to understand her problems, and to love her". A guidebook to the game called Serial Experiments Lain Official Guide was released the same month by MediaWorks.

See also
Noosphere

References

Further reading

Napier, Susan J. (2005) Anime from Akira to Howl's Moving Castle: Experiencing Contemporary Japanese Animation 
Prévost, Adèle-Elise; Musebasement (2008) "Manga: The Signal of Noise" Mechademia 3 pp. 173–188

External links

  
  
 Official Funimation website
 

1998 Japanese television series debuts
1998 Japanese television series endings
1998 anime television series debuts
Anime and manga about parallel universes
Anime with original screenplays
Artificial intelligence in fiction
Brain–computer interfacing in fiction
Cyberpunk anime and manga
Existentialist anime and manga
Fiction about consciousness transfer
Funimation
Geneon USA
NBCUniversal Entertainment Japan
Odex
Philosophical anime and manga
Psychological horror anime and manga
TV Tokyo original programming
Television series about parallel universes
Television shows about virtual reality
Transhumanism in anime and manga